Delmar Apartments, also known as Chelten Station, is a historic apartment building located in the Germantown neighborhood of Philadelphia, Pennsylvania.  It was built in 1902, and is a five-story, "U"-shaped brick building in the Colonial Revival-style. The first floor is faced in Wissahickon schist and has a wood porch.  It features four-story bay windows, a terra cotta cornice, and pediment above the main entrance. It was the first large apartment building built in the Germantown-Chestnut Hill area.

It was added to the National Register of Historic Places in 1982.

References

Residential buildings on the National Register of Historic Places in Philadelphia
Colonial Revival architecture in Pennsylvania
Residential buildings completed in 1902
Germantown, Philadelphia